John E. Laird (born March 16, 1954, in Ann Arbor, Michigan) is a computer scientist who, with Paul Rosenbloom and Allen Newell, created the Soar cognitive architecture at Carnegie Mellon University.  Laird is a Professor of the Computer Science and Engineering Division of the Electrical Engineering and Computer Science Department of the University of Michigan.

Education and career
John Laird received a BS in Communication and Computer Science from the University of Michigan in 1975 and a Ph.D. in computer science from Carnegie Mellon University in 1983. His Ph.D. thesis advisor was Allen Newell. Laird was a researcher at Xerox PARC in the Intelligent Systems Laboratory from 1984 to 1986; in 1986 he joined the faculty at the University of Michigan.

Laird has continued to do research on architectures of the mind and to develop and evolve the Soar architecture since his time at CMU. He organizes the annual Soar workshop and participates in the international Soar Research Group. In 1998 he co-founded Soar Technology, a company that specializes in creating autonomous AI entities based on Soar; he currently serves on its board of directors.  His particular research interests are cognitive architecture, problem solving, learning, reinforcement learning, episodic memory, semantic memory, and emotion-inspired processing. He is a Fellow of ACM, the Association for the Advancement of Artificial Intelligence (AAAI), the Cognitive Science Society, and the American Association for the Advancement of Science (AAAS).

Publications
 The Soar Cognitive Architecture, Laird, J. E., 2012, MIT Press. 
 The Soar Papers: Readings on Integrated Intelligence, Rosenbloom, Laird, and Newell (1993)
 Soar: An Architecture for General Intelligence, Artificial Intelligence, 33: 1-64. Laird, Rosenbloom, Newell, John and Paul, Allen (1987)

References
 Professional History on University of Michigan Website
 Soar Technology

External links
 Soar project home page
 John E. Laird's Home Page

1954 births
Living people
American computer scientists
University of Michigan faculty
University of Michigan alumni
Carnegie Mellon University alumni
Fellows of the Association for the Advancement of Artificial Intelligence
Fellows of the Cognitive Science Society
Fellows of the Association for Computing Machinery